Notoclinops is the name of a genus of triplefins in the family Tripterygiidae from New Zealand.

Etymology
The generic name Notoclinops refers to the superficial resemblance of the species in Notoclinops to the distantly related genus Notoclinus the two sharing a head lacking in scales, a broken lateral line and four spines in first dorsal fin.

Species
Three species are currently recognised within Notoclinops;

 Blue dot triplefin, Notoclinops caerulepunctus Hardy, 1989
 Blue-eyed triplefin, Notoclinops segmentatus (McCulloch & Phillipps, 1923)
 Yaldwyn's triplefin, Notoclinops yaldwyni Hardy, 1987

References

 
Tripterygiidae